The Kinner C-5 was an American five cylinder radial engine for small general and sport aircraft of the 1930s.

Design and development
The C-5 was a development of the earlier R-5 with greater power and dimensions. The main change was the increase in cylinder bore from 128 mm (5.0 in) to 143 mm (5.625 in) and an increase in cylinder stroke from 140 mm (5.5 in) to 145 mm (5.75 in). This led to a corresponding increase in displacement from 8.85 liters (540 cu in) to 11.71 liters (715 cu in).

The U.S. military designation was R-720.

Applications
 Consolidated YPT-11B
 Kellett K-3
 Kinner P
 Stearman 6H Cloudboy
 Stearman YPT-9C
 Verville YPT-10D
 Waco OSO
 Waco OEC
 Waco ODC
 Waco OBF
 Waterman FlexWing

Specifications

See also

References

1930s aircraft piston engines
Aircraft air-cooled radial piston engines